The Grinnell was an electric car manufactured in Detroit, Michigan by the Grinnell Electric Car Company from 1910-13. The Grinnell was a five-seater closed coupe that sat on a  wheelbase. The company claimed to have a  range per charge. The vehicle cost $2,800. By contrast, Ford Model F of 1905 and the Enger 40 were both US$2000, the FAL was US$1750, the Oakland 40 US$1600, and the Cole 30 and Colt Runabout US$1500.

Grinnell Electrics were produced from 1912-15. Originally a joint venture with Phipps. After 1915 Grinnell Bros. decided to focus on the musical instrument business, which began in Ann Arbor in 1879.

See also

List of defunct United States automobile manufacturers
History of the electric vehicle

Other Early Electric Vehicles
American Electric 
Argo Electric
Babcock Electric Carriage Company
Berwick
Binghamton Electric
Buffalo Electric
Century
Columbia Automobile Company
Dayton Electric
Detroit Electric
Menominee
Rauch and Lang 
Riker Electric

References

Clymer, Floyd. Treasury of Early American Automobiles, 1877-1925. New York: Bonanza Books, 1950.
 

Defunct motor vehicle manufacturers of the United States
Motor vehicle manufacturers based in Michigan
Electric vehicles introduced in the 20th century
1900s cars
1910s cars
Vehicle manufacturing companies established in 1910
American companies established in 1910
Vehicle manufacturing companies disestablished in 1913
Defunct brands
1910 establishments in Michigan
1913 establishments in Michigan
Defunct manufacturing companies based in Detroit